John Fisher (4 August 1897 – 22 June 1954) was an English cricketer who played for Derbyshire in 1921 and 1922.

Fisher was born in Hodthorpe, Derbyshire. He made his debut for Derbyshire in 1921 in a match against Essex when he made his top score of 39 after being moved up the batting order for the second innings. He appeared in another match that season and once in 1922. He was a left-hand batsman who played 6 innings in 3 first-class matches with an average of 10.4. As a right-arm medium-pace bowler he bowled 30 balls but made no impression.

Fisher died in Castleford, Yorkshire.

References

1897 births
1954 deaths
English cricketers
Derbyshire cricketers